Emanuel Öz (born 1979) is a Swedish politician, lawyer and former member of the Riksdag, the national legislature. A member of the Social Democratic Party, he represented Stockholm Municipality between September 2014 and September 2018.

Öz is the son of Selim Öz and nurse Terzo Öz. He was educated in Tensta. He has a Bachelor of Laws from Stockholm University. He has been practising law since 2006.

References

1979 births
21st-century Swedish lawyers
Living people
Members of the Riksdag 2014–2018
Members of the Riksdag from the Social Democrats
Politicians from Stockholm
Stockholm University alumni